The history of Pittsburgh began with centuries of Native American civilization in the modern Pittsburgh region, known as "Dionde:gâ'" in the Seneca language. Eventually, European explorers encountered the strategic confluence where the Allegheny and Monongahela Rivers meet to form the Ohio, which leads to the Mississippi River. The area became a battleground when France and Great Britain fought for control in the 1750s. When the British were victorious, the French ceded control of territories east of the Mississippi.

Following American independence in 1783, the village around Fort Pitt continued to grow.  The region saw the short-lived Whiskey Rebellion, when farmers rebelled against federal taxes on whiskey. The War of 1812 cut off the supply of British goods, stimulating American manufacture.  By 1815, Pittsburgh was producing large quantities of iron, brass, tin, and glass products. By the 1840s, Pittsburgh had grown to be one of the largest cities west of the Allegheny Mountains. Production of steel began in 1875. During the 1877 railway riots it was the site of the most violence and damage in any city affected by the nationwide strikes of that summer. Workers protested against cuts in wages, burning down buildings at the railyards, including 100 train engines and more than 1,000 cars. Forty men were killed, most of them strikers. By 1911, Pittsburgh was producing half the nation's steel.

Pittsburgh was a Republican party stronghold until 1932. The soaring unemployment of the Great Depression, the New Deal relief programs and the rise of powerful labor unions in the 1930s turned the city into a liberal stronghold of the New Deal Coalition under powerful Democratic mayors. In World War II, it was the center of the "Arsenal of Democracy", producing munitions for the Allied war effort as prosperity returned.

Following World War II, Pittsburgh launched a clean air and civic revitalization project known as the "Renaissance." The industrial base continued to expand through the 1960s, but after 1970 foreign competition led to the collapse of the steel industry, with massive layoffs and mill closures. Top corporate headquarters moved out in the 1980s. In 2007 the city lost its status as a major transportation hub. The population of the Pittsburgh metropolitan area is holding steady at 2.4 million; 65% of its residents are of European descent and 35% are minorities.

Native American era

For thousands of years, Native Americans inhabited the region where the Allegheny and the Monongahela join to form the Ohio. Paleo-Indians conducted a hunter-gatherer lifestyle in the region perhaps as early as 19,000 years ago. Meadowcroft Rockshelter, an archaeological site west of Pittsburgh, provides evidence that these first Americans lived in the region from that date. During the Adena culture that followed, Mound Builders erected a large Indian Mound at the future site of McKees Rocks, about three miles (5 km) from the head of the Ohio. The Indian Mound, a burial site, was augmented in later years by members of the Hopewell culture.

By 1700 the Haudenosaunee, the Five Nations-based south of the Great Lakes in present-day New York, held dominion over the upper Ohio valley, reserving it for hunting grounds.  Other tribes included the Lenape, who had been displaced from eastern Pennsylvania by European settlement, and the Shawnee, who had migrated up from the south. With the arrival of European explorers, these tribes and others had been devastated by infectious diseases from Europe, such as smallpox, measles, influenza, and malaria, to which they had no immunity.

In 1748, when Conrad Weiser visited Logstown,  downriver from Pittsburgh, he counted 789 warriors gathered: the Iroquois included 163 Seneca, 74 Mohawk, 35 Onondaga, 20 Cayuga, and 15 Oneida. Other tribes were 165 Lenape, 162 Shawnee, 100 Wyandot, 40 Tisagechroami, and 15 Mohican.

Shannopin's Town, a Lenape (Delaware) village on the east bank of the Allegheny, was established in the 1720s and was deserted after 1758. The village is believed to have been roughly from where Penn Avenue is today, below the mouth of Two Mile Run, from 30th Street to 39th Street. According to George Croghan, the town was situated on the south bank of the Allegheny, nearly opposite what is now known as Herr's Island, in what is now the Lawrenceville neighborhood in the city of Pittsburgh.

Sawcunk, on the mouth of the Beaver River, was a Lenape settlement and the principal residence of Shingas, a chief of theirs. Chartier's Town was a Shawnee town established in 1734 by Peter Chartier. Kittanning was a Lenape and Shawnee village on the Allegheny, with an estimated 300–400 residents.

Early colonization (1747–1763)

The first Europeans arrived in the 1710s as traders. Michael Bezallion was the first to describe the forks of the Ohio in a manuscript in 1717, and later that year European traders established posts and settlements in the area.
Europeans first began to settle in the region in 1748, when the first Ohio Company, a Virginian land speculation company, won a grant of 200,000 acres (800 km2) in the upper Ohio Valley. From a post at present-day Cumberland, Maryland, the company began to construct an  wagon road to the Monongahela River<ref
 name="Lorant"></ref> employing a Lenape Indian chief named Nemacolin and a party of settlers headed by Capt. Michael Cresap to begin widening the track into a road. It mostly followed the same route as an existing Native American trail<ref
 name="FortsCom">

</ref> now known as Nemacolin's Trail. The river crossing and flats at Redstone creek, was the earliest point and shortest distance for the descent of a wagon road. Later in the war, the site fortified as Fort Burd (now Brownsville) was one of several possible destinations. Another alternative was the divergent route that became Braddock's Road a few years later through present-day New Stanton. In the event, the colonists did not succeed in turning the path into a wagon road much beyond the Cumberland Narrows pass before they came into conflict with Native Americans. The colonists later mounted a series of expeditions in order to accomplish piecemeal improvements to the track.

The nearby Native American community of Logstown was an important trade and council center in the Ohio Valley. Between June 15 and November 10, 1749, an expedition headed by Celeron de Bienville, a French officer, traveled down the Allegheny and Ohio to bolster the French claim to the region. De Bienville warned away British traders and posted markers claiming the territory.

In 1753, Marquis Duquesne, the Governor of New France, sent another, larger expedition. At present-day Erie, Pennsylvania, an advance party built Fort Presque Isle. They also cut a road through the woods and built Fort Le Boeuf on French Creek, from which it was possible at high water to float to the Allegheny. By summer, an expedition of 1,500 French and Native American men descended the Allegheny. Some wintered at the confluence of French Creek and the Allegheny. The following year, they built Fort Machault at that site.

Alarmed at these French incursions in the Ohio Valley, Governor Dinwiddie of Virginia sent Major George Washington to warn the French to withdraw. Accompanied by Christopher Gist, Washington arrived at the Forks of the Ohio on November 25, 1753.

Proceeding up the Allegheny, Washington presented Dinwiddie's letter to the French commanders first at Venango, and then Fort Le Boeuf. The French officers received Washington with wine and courtesy, but did not withdraw.

Governor Dinwiddie sent Captain William Trent to build a fort at the Forks of the Ohio. On February 17, 1754, Trent began construction of the fort, the first European habitation at the site of present-day Pittsburgh. The fort, named Fort Prince George, was only half-built by April 1754, when over 500 French forces arrived and ordered the 40-some colonials back to Virginia. The French tore down the British fortification and constructed Fort Duquesne.

Governor Dinwiddie launched another expedition. Colonel Joshua Fry commanded the regiment with his second-in-command, George Washington, leading an advance column. On May 28, 1754, Washington's unit clashed with the French in the Battle of Jumonville Glen, during which 13 French soldiers were killed and 21 were taken prisoner. After the battle, Washington's ally, Seneca chief Tanaghrisson, unexpectedly executed the French commanding officer, Ensign Joseph Coulon de Jumonville. The French pursued Washington and on July 3, 1754, George Washington surrendered following the Battle of Fort Necessity. These frontier actions contributed to the start of the French and Indian War (1754–1763), or, the Seven Years' War, a global confrontation between Britain and France fought in both hemispheres.

In 1755, the Braddock Expedition was launched, accompanied by Virginia militia officer George Washington. Two regiments marched from Fort Cumberland across the Allegheny Mountains and into western Pennsylvania. Braddock's Road, as it was known, blazed the way for the future National Road (US40). The expedition crossed the Monongahela River on July 9, 1755. French troops from Fort Duquesne ambushed Braddock's expedition at Braddock's Field, nine miles (14 km) from Fort Duquesne. In the Battle of the Monongahela, the French inflicted heavy losses on the British, and Braddock was mortally wounded. The surviving British and colonial forces retreated. This left the French and their Native American allies with dominion over the upper Ohio valley.

On September 8, 1756, an expedition of 300 militiamen destroyed the Shawnee and Lenape village of Kittanning, and in the summer of 1758, British Army officer John Forbes began a campaign to capture Fort Duquesne. At the head of 7,000 regular and colonial troops, Forbes built Fort Ligonier and Fort Bedford, from where he cut a wagon road over the Allegheny Mountains, later known as Forbes' Road. On the night of September 13–14, 1758, an advance column under Major James Grant was annihilated in the Battle of Fort Duquesne. The battleground, the high hill east of the Point, was named Grant's Hill in his memory. With this defeat, Forbes decided to wait until spring. But when he heard that the French had lost Fort Frontenac and largely evacuated Fort Duquesne, he planned an immediate attack. Hopelessly outnumbered, the French abandoned and razed Fort Duquesne. Forbes occupied the burned fort on November 25, 1758, and ordered the construction of Fort Pitt, named after British Secretary of State William Pitt the Elder. He also named the settlement between the rivers, "Pittsborough" (see Etymology of Pittsburgh). The British garrison at Fort Pitt made substantial improvements to its fortification. The French never attacked Fort Pitt and the war soon ended with the Treaty of Paris and French defeat. They ceded their territories east of the Mississippi River.

Gateway to the West (1763–1799)
In 1760, the first considerable European settlement around Fort Pitt began to grow. Traders and settlers built two groups of houses and cabins, the "lower town," near the fort's ramparts, and the "upper town," along the Monongahela as far as present-day Market Street. In April 1761, a census ordered by Colonel Henry Bouquet and conducted by William Clapham counted 332 people and 104 houses.

After Britain's victory in the French and Indian War, increasing dissatisfaction among Native Americans with British policies led to the outbreak of Pontiac's War. The Odawa leader Pontiac launched an offensive against British forts in May 1763. Native American tribes from the Ohio Valley and the Great Lakes overran numerous British forts; one of their most important targets was Fort Pitt. Receiving warning of the coming attack, Captain Simeon Ecuyer, the Swiss officer in command of the garrison, prepared for a siege. He leveled the houses outside the ramparts and ordered all settlers into the fort: 330 men, 104 women, and 196 children sought refuge inside its ramparts. Captain Ecuyer also gathered stores, which included hundreds of barrels of pork and beef. Pontiac's forces attacked the fort on June 22, 1763, and the siege of Fort Pitt lasted for two months. Pontiac's warriors kept up a continuous, though ineffective, fire on it from July 27 through August 1, 1763. They drew off to confront the relieving party under Colonel Bouquet, which defeated them in the Battle of Bushy Run. This victory ensured British dominion over the forks of the Ohio, if not the entire Ohio valley. In 1764 Colonel Bouquet added a redoubt, the Fort Pitt Blockhouse, which still stands, the sole remaining structure from Fort Pitt and the oldest authenticated building west of the Allegheny Mountains.

The Iroquois signed the Fort Stanwix Treaty of 1768, ceding the lands south of the Ohio to the British Crown. European expansion into the upper Ohio valley increased. An estimated 4,000 to 5,000 families settled in western Pennsylvania between 1768 and 1770. Of these settlers, about a third were English-American, another third were Scotch-Irish, and the rest were Welsh, German and others. These groups tended to settle together in small farming communities, but often their households were not within hailing distance. The life of a settler family was one of relentless hard work: clearing the forest, stumping the fields, building cabins and barns, planting, weeding, and harvesting. In addition, almost everything was manufactured by hand, including furniture, tools, candles, buttons, and needles. Settlers had to deal with harsh winters, and with snakes, black bears, mountain lions, and timber wolves. Because of the fear of raids by Native Americans, the settlers often built their cabins near, or even on top of, springs, to ensure access to water. They also built blockhouses, where neighbors would rally during conflicts.

Increasing violence, especially by the Shawnee, Miami, and Wyandot tribes, led to Dunmore's War in 1774. Conflict with Native Americans continued throughout the Revolutionary War, as some hoped that the war would end with expulsion of the settlers from their territory. In 1777, Fort Pitt became a United States fort, when Brigadier General Edward Hand took command. In 1779, Colonel Daniel Brodhead led 600 men from Fort Pitt to destroy Seneca villages along the upper Allegheny.

With the war still ongoing, in 1780 Virginia and Pennsylvania came to an agreement on their mutual borders, creating the state lines known today and determining finally that the jurisdiction of Pittsburgh region was Pennsylvanian. In 1783, the Revolutionary War ended, which also brought at least a temporary cessation of border warfare. In the 1784 Treaty of Fort Stanwix, the Iroquois ceded the land north of the Purchase Line to Pennsylvania.

After the Revolution, the village of Pittsburgh continued to grow. One of its earliest industries was boat building. Flatboats could be used to carry large numbers of pioneers and goods downriver, while keelboats were capable of traveling upriver.

The village began to develop vital institutions. Hugh Henry Brackenridge, a Pittsburgh resident and state legislator, introduced a bill that resulted in a gift deed of land and a charter for the Pittsburgh Academy on February 28, 1787. The academy later developed as the University of Western Pennsylvania (1819) and since 1908 has been known as the University of Pittsburgh.

Many farmers distilled their corn harvest into whiskey, increasing its value while lowering its transportation costs. At that time, whiskey was used as a form of currency on the frontier. When the federal government imposed an excise tax on whiskey, Western Pennsylvania farmers felt victimized, leading to the Whiskey Rebellion in 1794. Farmers from the region rallied at Braddock's Field and marched on Pittsburgh. The short-lived rebellion was put down, however, when President George Washington sent in militias from several states.

The town continued to grow in manufacturing capability. In 1792, the boatyards in Pittsburgh built a sloop, Western Experiment. During the next decades, the yards produced other large boats. By the 19th century, they were building ocean-going vessels that shipped goods as far as Europe. In 1794, the town's first courthouse was built; it was a wooden structure on Market Square. In 1797, the manufacture of glass began.

Iron City (1800–1859)

Commerce continued to be an essential part of the economy of early Pittsburgh, but increasingly, manufacture began to grow in importance. Pittsburgh was located in the middle of one of the most productive coalfields in the country; the region was also rich in petroleum, natural gas, lumber, and farm goods. Blacksmiths forged iron implements, from horse shoes to nails. By 1800, the town, with a population of 1,565 persons, had over 60 shops, including general stores, bakeries, and hat and shoe shops.

The 1810s were a critical decade in Pittsburgh's growth. In 1811, the first steamboat was built in Pittsburgh. Increasingly, commerce would also flow upriver. The War of 1812 catalyzed growth of the Iron City. The war with Britain, the manufacturing center of the world, cut off the supply of British goods, stimulating American manufacture. In addition, the British blockade of the American coast increased inland trade, so that goods flowed through Pittsburgh from all four directions. By 1815, Pittsburgh was producing $764K in iron; $249K in brass and tin, and $235K in glass products. When, on March 18, 1816, Pittsburgh was incorporated as a city, it had already taken on some of its defining characteristics: commerce, manufacture, and a constant cloud of coal dust.

Other emerging towns challenged Pittsburgh. In 1818, the first segment of the National Road was completed, from Baltimore to Wheeling, bypassing Pittsburgh. This threatened to render the town less essential in east–west commerce. In the coming decade, however, many improvements were made to the transportation infrastructure. In 1818, the region's first river bridge, the Smithfield Street Bridge, opened, the first step in developing the "City of bridges" over its two rivers. On October 1, 1840, the original Pennsylvania Turnpike was completed, connecting Pittsburgh and the eastern port city of Philadelphia. In 1834, the Pennsylvania Main Line Canal was completed, making Pittsburgh part of a transportation system that included rivers, roads, and canals.

Manufacture continued to grow. In 1835, McClurg, Wade and Co. built the first locomotive west of the Alleghenies. Already, Pittsburgh was capable of manufacturing the most essential machines of its age. By the 1840s, Pittsburgh was one of the largest cities west of the mountains. In 1841, the Second Court House, on Grant's Hill, was completed.

Like many burgeoning cities of its day, Pittsburgh's growth outstripped some of its necessary infrastructure, such as a water supply with dependable pressure. Because of this, on April 10, 1845, a great fire burned out of control, destroying over a thousand buildings and causing $9M in damages. As the city rebuilt, the age of rails arrived. In 1851, the Ohio and Pennsylvania Railroad began service between Cleveland and Allegheny City (present-day North Side). In 1854, the Pennsylvania Railroad began service between Pittsburgh and Philadelphia.

Despite many challenges, Pittsburgh had grown into an industrial powerhouse. An 1857 article provided a snapshot of the Iron City:
 939 factories in Pittsburgh and Allegheny City
 employing more than 10K workers
 producing almost $12M in goods
 using 400 steam engines
 Total coal consumed — 22M bushels
 Total iron consumed — 127K tons
 In steam tonnage, third busiest port in the nation, surpassed only by New York City and New Orleans.

Steel City (1859–1946)

The iron and steel industry developed rapidly after 1830 and became one of the dominant factors in industrial America by the 1860s.

Scots Irish leadership
Ingham (1978) examined the leadership of the industry in its most important center, Pittsburgh, as well as smaller cities. He concludes that the leadership of the iron and steel industry nationwide was "largely Scotch Irish". Ingham finds that the Scotch Irish held together cohesively throughout the 19th century and "developed their own sense of uniqueness."

New immigrants after 1800 made Pittsburgh a major Scotch-Irish stronghold. For example, Thomas Mellon (b. Ulster 1813–1908) left northern Ireland in 1823 for the United States. He founded the powerful Mellon family, which played a central role in banking and industries such as aluminum and oil. As Barnhisel (2005) finds, industrialists such as James Laughlin (b. Ulster 1806–1882) of Jones and Laughlin Steel Company comprised the "Scots-Irish Presbyterian ruling stratum of Pittsburgh society."

Technology
In 1859, the Clinton and Soho iron furnaces introduced coke-fire smelting to the region. The American Civil War boosted the city's economy with increased production of iron and armaments, especially at the Allegheny Arsenal and the Fort Pitt Foundry. Arms manufacture included iron-clad warships and the world's first 21" gun. By war's end, over one-half of the steel and more than one-third of all U.S. glass was produced in Pittsburgh. A milestone in steel production was achieved in 1875, when the Edgar Thomson Works in Braddock began to make steel rail using the new Bessemer process.

Industrialists such as Andrew Carnegie, Henry Clay Frick, Andrew W. Mellon, and Charles M. Schwab built their fortunes in Pittsburgh. Also based in Pittsburgh was George Westinghouse, credited with such advancements as the air brake and founder of over 60 companies, including Westinghouse Air and Brake Company (1869), Union Switch & Signal (1881), and Westinghouse Electric Company (1886). Banks played a key role in Pittsburgh's development as these industrialists sought massive loans to upgrade plants, integrate industries and fund technological advances. For example, T. Mellon & Sons Bank, founded in 1869, helped to finance an aluminum reduction company that became Alcoa.

Ingham (1991) shows how small, independent iron and steel manufacturers survived and prospered from the 1870s through the 1950s, despite competition from much larger, standardized production firms. These smaller firms were built on a culture that valued local markets and the beneficial role of business in the local community. Small firms concentrated on specialized products, particularly structural steel, where the economies of scale of larger firms were no advantage. They embraced technological change more cautiously than larger firms. They also had less antagonistic relations with workers and employed a higher percentage of highly skilled workers than their mass-production counterparts.

Geography of industrialization
Beginning in the 1870s, entrepreneurs transformed the economy from small, craft-organized factories located inside the city limits to a large integrated industrial region stretching 50 miles across Allegheny County. The new industrial Pittsburgh was based on integrated mills, mass production, and modern management organization in steel and other industries. Many manufacturers searched for large sites with railroad and river accessibility. They purchased land, designed modern plants, and sometimes built towns for workers. Other firms bought into new communities that began as speculative industrial real estate ventures. Some owners removed their plants from the central city's labor unions to exert greater control over workers. The region's rugged topography and dispersed natural resources of coal and gas accentuated this dispersal. The rapid growth of steel, glass, railroad equipment, and coke industries resulted in both large mass-production plants and numerous smaller firms. As capital deepened and interdependence grew, participants multiplied, economies accrued, the division of labor increased, and localized production systems formed around these industries. Transportation, capital, labor markets, and the division of labor in production bound the scattered industrial plants and communities into a sprawling metropolitan district. By 1910 the Pittsburgh district was a complex urban landscape with a dominant central city, surrounded by proximate residential communities, mill towns, satellite cities, and hundreds of mining towns.

Representative of the new industrial suburbs was the model town of Vandergrift, according to Mosher (1995).  Caught up in a dramatic round of industrial restructuring and labor tension, Pittsburgh steelmaker George McMurtry hired Frederick Law Olmsted's landscape architectural firm in 1895 to design Vandergrift as a model town. McMurtry believed in what was later known as welfare capitalism, with the company going beyond paychecks to provide for the social needs of the workers; he believed that a benign physical environment made for happier and more productive workers. A  strike and lockout at McMurtry's steelworks in Apollo, Pennsylvania, prompted him to build the new town. Wanting a loyal workforce, he developed a town agenda that drew upon environmentalism as well as popular attitudes toward capital's treatment of labor. The Olmsted firm translated this agenda into an urban design that included a unique combination of social reform, comprehensive infrastructure planning, and private homeownership principles. The rates of homeownership and cordial relationships between the steel company and Vandergrift residents fostered loyalty among McMurtry's skilled workers and led to McMurtry's greatest success. In 1901 he used Vandergrift's worker-residents to break the first major strike against the United States Steel Corporation.

Machine politics
Christopher Magee and William Flinn operated powerful Republican machines that controlled local politics after 1880. They were business owners and favored business interests. Flinn was a leader of the Progressive movement statewide and supported Theodore Roosevelt in the 1912 election.

Germans
During the mid-19th century, Pittsburgh witnessed a dramatic influx of German immigrants, including a brick mason whose son, Henry J. Heinz, founded the H.J. Heinz Company in 1869. Heinz was at the forefront of reform efforts to improve food purity, working conditions, hours, and wages, but the company bitterly opposed the formation of an independent labor union.

Labor unions
As a manufacturing center, Pittsburgh also became an arena for intense labor strife. During the Great Railroad Strike of 1877, Pittsburgh workers protested and had massive demonstrations that erupted into widespread violence, known as the Pittsburgh Railway Riots. Meanwhile, tech giants such as Apple, Google, IBM Watson, Facebook, and Intel have joined the 1,600 technology firms choosing to operate out of Pittsburgh.  As a result of the proximity to CMU's National Robotics Engineering Center (NREC), there has a boom of autonomous vehicles companies.  The region has also become a leader in green environmental design, a movement exemplified by the city's convention center.  In the last twenty years the region has seen a small but influential group of Asian immigrants, including from the Indian sub-continent. It has been generally considered as the most recovered city from the rust belt.

Jurisdiction timeline
Possibly as early as 17,000 BCE, and until approximately 1750 CE, the area was home to numerous Native American groups, including the Lenape and Seneca tribes.
1669 Claimed for the French Empire by René-Robert Cavelier, Sieur de La Salle.
1681 King Charles claims the forks for Pennsylvania with 5 degrees west of the Delaware.
1694 Arnout Viele a Dutch trader explores the area.
1717 Settled by European traders, primarily Pennsylvanians; dispute occurs between Virginia and Pennsylvania.
1727 Joncaire visits with a small French force.
1748 Both Pennsylvanian Conrad Weiser visits and the Kingd approves the Ohio Company for Virginia.
1749 Frenchman Louis Blainville deCeleron sails by on the Allegheny and Ohio burying lead plates claiming the area for France.
1750 Cumberland County Pennsylvania founded, though its jurisdiction is not governable.
1753 George Washington visits en route to Fort LeBeouf.
1754 French Forces occupy the area and construct Fort Duquesne.
1757 Jesuit Father Claude Francis Virot founded Catholic Mission at Beaver.
1758 British Forces regain the area and establish Fort Pitt though some dispute over claims between the colonies of Pennsylvania (Cumberland County) and Virginia (Augusta County).
1761 Ayr Township, Cumberland County, Pennsylvania.
1763 The Proclamation of 1763 grants Quebec rights to all lands west of the Alleghenies and North of the Ohio River.
1767 Bedford Township, Cumberland County, Pennsylvania.
1770 George Washington visits for Virginia.
1771 (March 9) Bedford County, Pennsylvania.
1771 (April 16) Pitt Township founded.
1773 (February 26) part of Westmoreland County, Pennsylvania.
1788 (September 24) part of Allegheny County, Pennsylvania.
1788 (December 16) A new Pitt Township is formed as a division of Allegheny County.
1792 (June) Petition for a Pittsburgh Township at the forks.
1792 (September 6) Pittsburgh Township, Allegheny County, Pennsylvania.
1794 (April 22) Pittsburgh borough, Allegheny County, Pennsylvania.
1816 (March 18) City of Pittsburgh, Allegheny County, Pennsylvania.

See also
 Timeline of Pittsburgh
 Westinghouse Works, 1904 - series of early films showing working conditions in Westinghouse factories
 List of mayors of Pittsburgh
 List of Pittsburgh neighborhoods
 List of major corporations in Pittsburgh
 University of Pittsburgh
 Pittsburgh Riot
 Pittsburgh Flood of 1936
 History of the Jews in Pittsburgh

References

Bibliography

 Baldwin, Leland D. Pittsburgh: The Story of a City (U of Pittsburgh Press, 1937) online
 
 Cannadine, David. Mellon: An American Life (2006), major biography of Thomas Mellon and Andrew Mellon, top financial leaders
 Carson, Carolyn Leonard. Healing Body, Mind, and Spirit: The History of the St. Francis Medical Center, Pittsburgh, Pennsylvania. Carnegie Mellon U. Press, 1995. 246 pp.
 
 Cowan, Aaron. A Nice Place to Visit: Tourism and Urban Revitalization in the Postwar Rustbelt (2016) compares Cincinnati, St. Louis, Pittsburgh, and Baltimore in the wake of deindustrialization.
 Crowley, Gregory J. The Politics of Place: Contentious Urban Redevelopment in Pittsburgh. (U. of Pittsburgh Press, 2005). 207 pp.
 Devault, Ileen A. Sons and Daughters of Labor: Class and Clerical Work in Turn-of-the-Century Pittsburgh. (Cornell U. Press, 1991). 194 pp.
 Dieterich-Ward, Allen Beyond Rust: Metropolitan Pittsburgh and the Fate of Industrial America. University of Pennsylvania Press, 2016. 347pp. online review
 Glasco, Laurence A., ed.  The WPA History of the Negro in Pittsburgh. (U. of Pittsburgh Press, 2004). 422 pp.
 Greenwald, Maurine W. and Margo Anderson, eds.  Pittsburgh Surveyed: Social Science and Social Reform in the Early Twentieth Century. U. of Pittsburgh Press, 1996. 292 pp.
 Grinder, Robert Dale. " From Insurgency to Efficiency: The Smoke Abatement Campaign in Pittsburgh before World War I." Western Pennsylvania Historical Magazine (1978) 61#3 pp 187–202. 
 Hays, Samuel P., ed. City at the Point: Essays on the Social History of Pittsburgh. U. of Pittsburgh Press, 1989. 473 pp.
 
  Hinshaw, John. Steel and Steelworkers: Race and Class Struggle in Twentieth-Century Pittsburgh. State U. of New York Press, 2002. 348 pp.
 Hoerr, John. And the Wolf Finally Came: The Decline of American Steel. U. of Pittsburgh Press, 1988. 689 pp.
 Holt, Michael. Forging a Majority: The Formation of the Republican Party in Pittsburgh, 1848-18 (1969).
 Ingham, John N.  Making Iron and Steel: Independent Mills in Pittsburgh, 1820–1920. Ohio State U. Press, 1991. 297 pp.
 Kleinberg, S. J.  The Shadow of the Mills: Working-Class Families in Pittsburgh, 1870–1907. U. of Pittsburgh Press, 1989. 414 pp.
 Kobus, Kenneth J. City of Steel: How Pittsburgh became the world's steelmaking capital during the Carnegie era (2015) 320pp.
 Krause, Paul.  The Battle for Homestead, 1880–1892: Politics, Culture, and Steel. U. of Pittsburgh Press, 1992. 548 pp.
 Lopez, Steven Henry.  Reorganizing the Rust Belt: An Inside Study of the American Labor Movement. U. of California Press, 2004. 314 pp.
 Lorant, Stefan. Pittsburgh: The Story of an American City, (1964), well written, heavily illustrated popular history
 Lubove, Roy. Twentieth Century Pittsburgh: Government, Business, and Environmental Change (1969).
  Lubove, Roy.  Twentieth-Century Pittsburgh. Vol. 2: The Post-Steel Era. U. of Pittsburgh Press, 1996. 413 pp.  the major scholarly synthesis.
 Mayfield, Loomis. "Voting Fraud in Early Twentieth-Century Pittsburgh." Journal of Interdisciplinary History 24#1 (1993), pp. 59–84 online
 Nasaw, David. Andrew Carnegie (2006), major scholarly biography. online
 Rishel, Joseph F.  Founding Families of Pittsburgh: The Evolution of a Regional Elite, 1760–1910. U. of Pittsburgh Press, 1990. 241 pp.
 Rose, James D.  Duquesne and the Rise of Steel Unionism. U. of Illinois Press, 2001. 284 pp.
 Ruck, Rob.  Sandlot Seasons: Sport in Black Pittsburgh. U. of Illinois Press, 1987. 238 pp.
 Seely, Bruce E., ed.  Iron and Steel in the Twentieth Century. Facts on File, 1994. 512 pp.
 Slavishak, Edward Steven. Bodies of Work: Civic Display and Labor in Industrial Pittsburgh (2008)
 Smith, Arthur G.  Pittsburgh: Then and Now. U. of Pittsburgh Press, 1990. 336 pp.
 Smith, George David.  From Monopoly to Competition: The Transformation of Alcoa, 1888–1986. Cambridge U. Press, 1988. 554 pp.
Stave, Bruce M. "Pittsburgh and the New Deal," in John Braeman et al. eds. The New Deal: Volume Two – the State and Local Levels (1975) pp 376–406
 
 Trotter, Joe W., and Jared N. Day.  Race and Renaissance: African Americans in Pittsburgh Since World War II (University of Pittsburgh Press; 2010) 328 pages. Draws on journalism, oral histories, and other sources to study the city's black community, including its experience of the city's industrial decline and rebirth.
 Wade, Richard C.  The Urban Frontier: The Rise of Western Cities, 1790–1830. (1959)
 Wall, Joseph. Andrew Carnegie (1970). 1137 pp.; major scholarly biography
 Warren, Kenneth. Triumphant Capitalism: Henry Clay Frick and the Industrial Transformation of America. U. of Pittsburgh Press, 1996.
 Weber, Michael P.  Don't Call Me Boss: David L. Lawrence, Pittsburgh's Renaissance Mayor. U. of Pittsburgh Press, 1988. 440 pp.
 Winant, Gabriel. The Next Shift: The Fall of Industry and the Rise of Health Care in Rust Belt America (Harvard University Press, 2021), focus on Pittsburgh

Primary sources
 Lubove, Roy, ed.  Pittsburgh 1976. 294 pp. short excerpts covering main themes
 
 Thomas, Clarke M. ed. Front-Page Pittsburgh: Two Hundred Years of the Post-Gazette. U. of Pittsburgh Press, 2005. 332 pp. readable copies of key front pages

External links

 
 
 
 
 
 
 
 Old photos of Pittsburg(h)
 "Wayward record of Pittsburgh's early years recovered by archivist"